Werri Beach is a town in the Illawarra, south of Kiama and immediately north of Gerringong in New South Wales, Australia. It is located on the coast of the Tasman Sea to the east of the Princes Highway.

References 

Towns in New South Wales
Beaches of New South Wales
Municipality of Kiama
Coastal towns in New South Wales